The Richard and Carole Cocks Art Museum is a public art museum located on the campus of Miami University in Oxford, Ohio. As of 2021, John "Jack" Green is the director and chief curator of the museum.

Building
Completed in 1978, the museum was designed by architect Walter Netsch of the firm Skidmore, Owings and Merrill based in Chicago. The building is located on three acres of park land and houses five galleries, containing around 16,000 artworks.

History
The construction of the Richard and Carole Cocks Art Museum was funded by private contributions to Miami University's Goals for Enrichment capital campaign in the mid-1970s. A major gift for the building came as a bequest from Miami alumnus Fred C. Yager, class of 1914. Walter I. Farmer, class of 1935, and former Art Department faculty member Orpha B. Webster donated art collections which helped develop an early foundation for the museum.

References

External links
 Official site

Miami University
Museums in Butler County, Ohio
Art museums and galleries in Ohio
University museums in Ohio
Sculpture gardens, trails and parks in the United States
Art museums established in 1978
1978 establishments in Ohio
Skidmore, Owings & Merrill buildings